The arrondissement of Lannion is an arrondissement of France in the Côtes-d'Armor department in the Brittany region. It has 57 communes.

Composition

The communes of the arrondissement of Lannion, and their INSEE codes, are:

 Berhet (22006)
 Camlez (22028)
 Caouënnec-Lanvézéac (22030)
 Cavan (22034)
 Coatascorn (22041)
 Coatréven (22042)
 Kerbors (22085)
 Kermaria-Sulard (22090)
 Langoat (22101)
 Lanmérin (22110)
 Lanmodez (22111)
 Lannion (22113)
 Lanvellec (22119)
 Lézardrieux (22127)
 Loguivy-Plougras (22131)
 Louannec (22134)
 Mantallot (22141)
 Minihy-Tréguier (22152)
 Penvénan (22166)
 Perros-Guirec (22168)
 Plestin-les-Grèves (22194)
 Pleubian (22195)
 Pleudaniel (22196)
 Pleumeur-Bodou (22198)
 Pleumeur-Gautier (22199)
 Plouaret (22207)
 Ploubezre (22211)
 Plougras (22217)
 Plougrescant (22218)
 Plouguiel (22221)
 Ploulec'h (22224)
 Ploumilliau (22226)
 Plounérin (22227)
 Plounévez-Moëdec (22228)
 Plouzélambre (22235)
 Plufur (22238)
 Pluzunet (22245)
 Prat (22254)
 Quemperven (22257)
 La Roche-Jaudy (22264)
 Rospez (22265)
 Saint-Michel-en-Grève (22319)
 Saint-Quay-Perros (22324)
 Tonquédec (22340)
 Trébeurden (22343)
 Trédarzec (22347)
 Trédrez-Locquémeau (22349)
 Tréduder (22350)
 Trégastel (22353)
 Trégrom (22359)
 Tréguier (22362)
 Trélévern (22363)
 Trémel (22366)
 Trévou-Tréguignec (22379)
 Trézény (22381)
 Troguéry (22383)
 Le Vieux-Marché (22387)

History

The arrondissement of Lannion was created in 1800.

As a result of the reorganisation of the cantons of France which came into effect in 2015, the borders of the cantons are no longer related to the borders of the arrondissements. The cantons of the arrondissement of Lannion were, as of January 2015:

 Lannion
 Lézardrieux
 Perros-Guirec
 Plestin-les-Grèves
 Plouaret
 La Roche-Derrien
 Tréguier

References

Lannion